Ships of the Royal Hellenic Navy in 1917

See also
History of the Hellenic Navy
List of naval ships of Greece

Elli